Allison Smith (born 18 March 1960) is an Australian former swimmer. She competed in three events at the 1976 Summer Olympics.

References

External links
 

1960 births
Living people
Australian female breaststroke swimmers
Olympic swimmers of Australia
Swimmers at the 1976 Summer Olympics
Place of birth missing (living people)
Commonwealth Games medallists in swimming
Commonwealth Games bronze medallists for Australia
Swimmers at the 1974 British Commonwealth Games
20th-century Australian women
Medallists at the 1974 British Commonwealth Games